The American Society of Plant Taxonomists (ASPT) is a botanical organization formed in 1935 to "foster, encourage, and promote education and research in the field of plant taxonomy, to include those areas and fields of study that contribute to and bear upon taxonomy and herbaria", according to its bylaws. It is incorporated in the state of Wyoming, and its office is at the University of Wyoming, Department of Botany.

The ASPT publishes a quarterly botanical journal, Systematic Botany, and the irregular series Systematic Botany Monographs. The society gives annual awards for excellence in Botany. The Society gives the Asa Gray Award for "outstanding accomplishments pertinent to the goals of the Society," and the Peter Raven Award to a botanist who has "made exceptional efforts at outreach to non-scientists."

Asa Gray Awardees
2021:Elizabeth Kellogg
2020:Jeff Doyle
2019:Lucinda McDade
2018:Vicki Funk
2017:Michael Donoghue
2016:Peter F. Stevens
2015:Warren Lambert Wagner
2014:Alan Smith
2013:Bruce Baldwin
2012:Noel and Patricia Holmgren
2011:Walter S. Judd
2010:Harold E. Robinson
2009:Alan Graham
2008:William R. Anderson
2007:Scott A. Mori
2006:Douglas E. Soltis and Pamela S. Soltis
2005:Grady Webster
2004:John Beaman
2003:Beryl B. Simpson
2002:Natalie Uhl
2001:Robert F. Thorne
2000:William T. Stearn
1999:Tod Stuessey
1998:Ghillean Prance
1997:Daniel J. Crawford
1996:Peter Raven
1995:Jerzy Rzedowski
1994:Hugh H. Iltis
1993:Sherwin Carlquist
1992:Albert Charles Smith
1991:Billie L. Turner
1990:Warren H. Wagner
1989:Rupert C. Barneby
1988:Charles B. Heiser
1987:Reed C. Rollins
1986:Lincoln Constance
1985:Arthur Cronquist
1984:Rogers McVaugh

Peter Raven Awardees
2021:Tanisha Williams
2020:Susan Pell
2019:Lena Struwe
2018:Chris Martine
2017:Hans Walter Lack
2016:Lynn G. Clark
2015:John Weirsema
2014:Ken Cameron
2013
2012
2011:Robbin C. Moran
2010:Barney Lipscomb
2009:Sandra Knapp
2008:W. Hardy Eshbaugh
2007:John T. Mickel
2006:Art Kruckeberg
2005:Alan W. Meerow
2004:David J. Mabberley
2003:Frederick W. Case
2002:Charles Heiser
2001:Richard C. Harris
2000:Peter Raven

References 

 https://employees.csbsju.edu/ssaupe/biol308/Lecture/introduction.htm
 ASPT home page
 Systematic Botany
 Systematic Botany Monographs

Plant taxonomy
Botanical societies
Taxonomy (biology) organizations
Natural Science Collections Alliance members
1935 establishments in the United States
Organizations established in 1935
Scientific societies based in the United States